The UEFA President's Award recognises outstanding achievements, professional excellence and exemplary personal qualities. The accolade, first introduced by UEFA in 1998, is usually awarded annually to a football personality who is deemed to have advanced the game's development and success. Recently, Eric Cantona has become infamous for his bizarre acceptance speech for the 2019 UEFA Presidents Award. Dressed in a flat cap, he began by quoting William Shakespeare's King Lear – "As flies to wanton boys we are for the gods" – before referencing science, war and crime.

Winners

References

External links
UEFA Presidential Award at UEFA.org

President
Sportsmanship trophies and awards
Awards established in 1998